Pipestela is a genus of sponges belonging to the family Axinellidae. The species of this genus are found in Australian waters, New Guinea and other countries to the north of Australia.

The genus was first described in 2008.

Species 
This genus contains the following five species:
Pipestela candelabra 
Pipestela hooperi 
Pipestela occidentalis 
Pipestela rara 
Pipestela terpenensis

References

External links
Pipestela occurrence data from GBIF

Axinellidae
Sponge genera
Taxa described in 2008
Taxa named by John Hooper (marine biologist)
Taxa named by Rob van Soest